Stanislav Hennadiyovych Sharay (born 25 May 1997) is a Ukrainian professional footballer who plays as a central midfielder for Ukrainian club Alians Lypova Dolyna.

Career

Veres Rivne
On 9 July 2022 he signed for Veres Rivne.

Personal life 
He is the twin brother of Vladyslav Sharay who is also a footballer.

References

External links
 
 

1997 births
Living people
People from Romny
Ukrainian footballers
Association football midfielders
FC Olimpik Donetsk players
FC Kramatorsk players
PFC Sumy players
FC Alians Lypova Dolyna players
NK Veres Rivne players
Ukrainian First League players
Ukrainian Second League players
Ukrainian Amateur Football Championship players
Ukrainian twins
Twin sportspeople
Sportspeople from Sumy Oblast